Chernukhin is a Russian surname shared by the following people:

Dmitry Chernukhin (born 1988), Russian footballer
Yevgeniy Chernukhin (born 1984), Belarusian football coach and a former player
Lubov Chernukhin (born 1972), British banker and political donor
Vladimir Chernukhin (born 1968), Russian deputy minister of finance

Russian-language surnames